Dale Keith McRaven (March 15, 1939 – September 5, 2022) was an American producer and screenwriter. He was perhaps best known for serving as the creator of Perfect Strangers, Angie (co-created with Garry Marshall), The Texas Wheelers and Mork & Mindy, which earned him a Primetime Emmy Award nomination in the category Outstanding Comedy Series. McRaven died in September 2022 from complications of lung cancer at his home in Porter Ranch, California, at the age of 83.

References

External links 

1939 births
2022 deaths
Deaths from lung cancer in California
Screenwriters from Illinois
American male screenwriters
American television writers
American male television writers
20th-century American screenwriters
20th-century American male writers
American television producers
People from Pulaski County, Illinois